Donsol, officially the Municipality of Donsol, (Central Bikol: Banwaan kan Donsol; Tagalog: Bayan ng Donsol) is a 3rd class municipality in the province of Sorsogon, Philippines. According to the 2020 census, it has a population of 50,281 people.

Geography

Barangays
Donsol is politically subdivided into 51 barangays.

Climate

Demographics

Language
The majority of the population speak Eastern Miraya, an Albay Bikol language of Inland Bikol group of languages. The language is also spoken in four towns of Albay and some parts of Pilar and Castilla, Sorsogon. It is mutually intelligible with Western Miraya. People of Donsol can also speak and understand Tagalog or Filipino, the national language, and English.

Religion
The majority of the people adhere to Catholicism and each barangay has a patron saint and fiestas are held annually. Iglesia ni Cristo is the second largest religion of the population and has several local congregations in the municipality.

Economy

Tourism

Whale shark (butanding) viewing

Swimming with whale sharks, locally known as butanding, was featured as the Best Animal Encounter in Asia by Time magazine in 2004. Whale sharks can be seen between November and June, with presence peaking between February and May.

The presence of whale sharks in the town of Donsol was known to the local residents for more than 100 years, but the locals believed these gentle giants were dangerous. This wrong notion changed when on December 26, 1997, a group of scuba divers led by Romir Aglugub – a PADI diving instructor, discovered their presence, interacted with, and came in contact with the whale sharks. Even the members of the diving group of Romir were having second thoughts about whether the fish is docile, until the instructor led the way into the water and came in contact with the whale sharks. Copy of video footage taken by the group was passed on to the media and the WWF-Philippines. By March 1998, Donsol became world-class tourist destination and now known as the “Whale Shark Capital of the World”.

Interaction with the whale sharks is regulated by the local Department of Tourism (DOT) office. WWF guidelines are generally observed to protect the sharks. Rules include limiting the number of swimmers per boat to six, prohibiting scuba divers, and requiring staying farther than three meters from the sharks.

In recent years the number of male sharks has out-numbered female sharks by 20:1. Generally, the females that are seen are large mature adults in the 7m ~ 9m range. Increasing numbers of sharks show propeller marks on their backs. Anecdotal evidence from local fishermen suggests that prop strikes are from fishing boats in the off-season, rather than from tourist boats during the main February–June tourist season.

In 2006 five sharks were found dead on the surface of the water, within 30 miles of Donsol. They had all been shot at close range. One shark had 13 bullet wounds to the head. The locals blame this on commercial fishermen shooting the sharks if they are caught in their nets. Manta rays, which are also protected in the Philippines, are also over-fished and sold in local markets in the Sorsogon area.

Groups from Singapore, Hong Kong, Taiwan, and the Philippines make up the largest groups of visitors. Most tourists book guided tours with dive centers familiar with whale shark interaction.

Food
Bicolano delicacies are plentiful in Donsol. Bicolano cuisine is well known for dishes cooked in "gata" or coconut cream. A famous dish to try is "laing" or "gabi", which is dried taro leaves cooked in coconut cream with cuts of meat or fish. Another famous Bicolano dish available in Donsol is "Bicol Express" which is pork stir fried with shrimp paste, heavy coconut cream, and green chilli peppers. It is a spicy dish that is best eaten with hot, steamed rice. A Filipino favourite is a dish called Sisig. Sisig is deep fried pork simmered in Calamansi juice, salt, pepper, and chilli peppers. It is eaten with hot, steamed rice or as a bar snack. There are a few restaurants in Donsol that serve these dishes.

Accommodations
Tourism continues to develop piecemeal in Donsol. The first hotel in the area is the Amor Farm Beach Resort, established in 1997, followed by the Woodland Beach Resort in 1998 that started off as a family vacation house. Interest to visit the quaint and quiet town grew as soon as news of whale shark sightings grew amongst the international marine biologist community. Tourists can now avail rooms that cater to all financial budgets, from the backpacker to the family vacationer from various resorts and homestays in Donsol.

Most establishments accept only cash, but there is an ATM in Donsol located inside the Municipal Town Hall. There now are several resorts that accept credit cards. Giddy's Place PADI Dive Resort in the town center and Elysia Beach Resort in Dancalan are two of them. Landlines are non-existent in Donsol and most rely on mobile telephones. Internet service came to Donsol in 2008 using cellular technology. There are a few internet shops in town.

Other attractions 
Donsol has a not so known, but equally unique, night firefly tour and shrimp-catching night tour available all-year round. Donsol also is becoming the best jump-off and base for divers to the Manta Bowl and San Miguel Island in Ticao due to the existence of better tourist facilities than the other rural towns. Diving in Donsol itself is not allowed. Donsol also is a great trekking and biking site, due mainly to the abundance of hilly areas and fields.

References

External links

 Donsol Profile at PhilAtlas.com
 Philippine Census Information
 Local Governance Performance Management System 
 LGU Profile of Donsol, Sorsogon
 WWF's Community-Based Ecotourism and Coastal Resources Management Project in Donsol, Sorsogon

Municipalities of Sorsogon